Debbie Rudd (born 27 September 1959) is a British former swimmer. Rudd competed at the 1976 Summer Olympics and the 1980 Summer Olympics.

She also represented England and won a silver medal in the 200 metres Breaststroke, at the 1978 Commonwealth Games in Edmonton, Alberta, Canada. She also won the 1976 ASA National Championship title in the 200 metres breaststroke.

References

External links
 

1959 births
Living people
British female swimmers
Olympic swimmers of Great Britain
Swimmers at the 1976 Summer Olympics
Swimmers at the 1980 Summer Olympics
Sportspeople from Solihull
Swimmers at the 1978 Commonwealth Games
Commonwealth Games medallists in swimming
Commonwealth Games silver medallists for England
Universiade medalists in swimming
Universiade silver medalists for Great Britain
Medalists at the 1979 Summer Universiade
20th-century British women
Medallists at the 1978 Commonwealth Games